Robert Hosie was a Scottish soccer inside forward who began his career in Scotland before moving to the United States. In the U.S., he played one season in the National Association Football League and five in the American Soccer League.

In October 1920, Hosie joined Brooklyn Robins Dry Dock of the National Association Football League (NAFBL). On 19 April 1921, Robins defeated St. Louis Scullin Steel F.C. in the National Challenge Cup. Hosie scored one of the four Robins goals in the 4–2 victory. That summer, several teams from the NAFBL joined with teams from the Southern New England Soccer League to form the American Soccer League (ASL). This move brought the merger Robins Dry Dock and Tebo Yacht Basin F.C., both sponsored by subsidiary companies of Todd Shipyards into a larger Todd Shipyards. Hosie moved from Robins to Todd Shipyards for the inaugural ASL season. By then the American Soccer League had replaced the NAFBL. Hosie did not become a regular until he signed with the Brooklyn Wanderers in 1924. That season, he played in thirty games, but the next season he only appeared in eight.

References

Scottish footballers
Scottish Football League players
Vale of Leven F.C. players
Third Lanark A.C. players
Clydebank F.C. (1914) players
St Bernard's F.C. players
National Association Football League players
Robins Dry Dock players
American Soccer League (1921–1933) players
Todd Shipyards (soccer team) players
Paterson F.C. (NAFBL) players
New York Field Club players
Brooklyn Wanderers players
New York Giants (soccer) players
Year of birth missing
Year of death missing
Association football forwards
Scottish expatriate sportspeople in the United States
Expatriate soccer players in the United States
Scottish expatriate footballers